Stalin: le tyran rouge (Stalin: The Red Tyrant) is a 2007 French television documentary film by Mathieu Schwartz, Serge de Sampigny, Yvan Demeulandre and the historic consultant Nicolas Werth about the government of Joseph Stalin in the Soviet Union.

External links
 
  

2007 television films
2007 films
French documentary television films
2000s French-language films
2007 documentary films
Documentary films about the Soviet Union in the Stalin era
2000s French films